Route 63 is a secondary state highway in the U.S. state of Connecticut, from New Haven up to Canaan, running for . It connects the Greater New Haven area to Northwestern Connecticut via the western suburbs of Waterbury.

Route description
Route 63 follows a mostly northwest-southeast path its entire route, and is mostly a 2 lane road with some 4 lane sections.  It begins at the corner of Whalley Avenue and Fitch Street in New Haven where Route 10 turns onto Fitch Street.  Heading northwest on Whalley Avenue, it almost immediately passes the eastern end of Route 243 and the northern end of Route 122.  About 0.6 miles later, it leaves Whalley Avenue for Amity Road at the southern end of Route 69.  It then passes under the Wilbur Cross Parkway (Route 15), offering southbound access only.  After crossing into Woodbridge, the road becomes less suburban in nature.  In Woodbridge, it intersects the eastern end of Route 114, and the southern/eastern end of Route 67.  It then crosses into Bethany, where it has a brief (0.1 mile) concurrency with Route 42.  It then enters Naugatuck, where the road takes on a more suburban character.  It then meets the Route 8 expressway at Exit 26 before crossing the Naugatuck River into the downtown area.  It then passes by the western end of Route 68 before becoming more rural again.  After clipping the southwest corner of Waterbury, it enters Middlebury.  After meeting the northern end of Route 188, it intersects I-84 at Exit 17, with access to/from the west.  Access to/from I-84 east is provided by Route 64 at the next intersection.  Route 63 then enters Litchfield County and the town of Watertown.  Here it is a major retail strip in the southern part of town.  It meets the northern end of Route 73 before crossing US 6 in the center of town.  It then becomes a minor arterial road north of town, and passes by the eastern end of Route 132 before entering Morris.  In Morris, it has junctions with Route 109 and the northern end of Route 61.  It then enters Litchfield, where it meets US 202 at the Litchfield Green.  Leaving Litchfield, Route 63 becomes a minor rural road as it passes into Goshen.  It meets Route 4 at a traffic circle in the center of town.  North of there, it passes into Cornwall, where it meets the north end of Route 43, then into the town of Canaan.  It has one junction with the southern end of Route 126, which leads to Falls Village.  Route 63 ends approximately 1.5 miles later at US 7. 

A  section of the road in Litchfield is a designated state scenic road.

History
Route 63 was designated in 1932 and originally connected Morris to Woodbridge using the alignment of the Straits Turnpike, an early 19th-century toll road connecting New Haven to Litchfield. Route 63 is still locally called the Straits Turnpike in Middlebury and Watertown. In the mid-1940s, Route 61 between Morris and Cornwall was reassigned to an extended Route 63. Another extension happened on September 11, 1951 when Route 63 took over part of Route 43 from Cornwall to Canaan where it ends today. In 1954, Route 63 was extended south to US 1 via an overlap with Route 10.

Junction list

References

External links

063
Transportation in New Haven County, Connecticut
Transportation in Litchfield County, Connecticut